Resurrection is the third full-length album by the melodic death/doom metal band Godgory. It was recorded in October 1998 at Studio Fasaden. Former members Mikael Dahlqvist (guitars) and Thomas Heder (keyboards) participated in the recordings as session members.

Track listing
 Resurrection - 07:05
 Crimson Snow - 03:28
 Adultery - 06:03
 My Dead Dreams - 03:47
 Death in Black - 05:20
 Collector of Tears - 04:15
 Waiting for Lunacy to Find Me - 06:37
 Princess of the Dawn (Accept cover) - 06:55
 Conspiracy of Silence (Bonus Track) - 07:55

Godgory albums
1999 albums